Wire Cache Provincial Park is a provincial park in British Columbia, Canada, located 90 km northeast of Clearwater.

In 1874 the provincial government contracted with F.J. Barnard to build a telegraph line from Cache Creek to Edmonton.  A lawsuit ensued when the government cancelled the contract in 1878.  A great deal of wire was abandoned in this area as a result.

Recreation
The park offers boating and fishing on the North Thompson River.

Geography
The park is located on a series of riverbends. There is an assortment of wildlife and wetland habitat, as well as cottonwood, spruce and cedar tree ecosystems.

References

External links
 BC Parks - Wire Cache Provincial Park

Provincial parks of British Columbia
Thompson Country
Protected areas established in 1996
1996 establishments in British Columbia